Kuçovë Air Base  is an air base located near Kuçovë, Berat, Albania.

History

Construction of the air base began in 1952 and was completed in 1955.

During the 1997 crisis, Kuçovë Air Base was captured by rebels. The damage caused by the protesters was not repaired until 1999.

From 2002 to 2004 the base was renovated to NATO standards. Improvements included a new control tower, new lighting, and repaving.

In 2004, Albania announced plans to scrap 80 obsolete aircraft in an effort to modernize for NATO membership. The aircraft being scrapped included MiG-15s, MiG-19s, and Yakovlev trainers as well as Chinese-made (Shenyang Aircraft Corporation) F-5s and F-6s. The aircraft were stored in Kuçovë during this process. Recently, many of these retired craft have been auctioned by the government of Albania.

In 2011, the base served as a filming location for the third episode of Top Gear's sixteenth series. The episode was seen as offensive to many due to derogatory comments made about Albanians by the cast.

In August 2018, the Prime Minister of Albania, Edi Rama, announced via Facebook that NATO would be investing in the base, saying "NATO will invest more than 50 million euros ($58 million) for the first phase of the project alone, to modernise air base in Kucova."

One feature of Kuçovë Air Base is the mountain storage area for aircraft, accessed by a separate taxiway among the farm fields, about 1 km east of the main taxiway, dispersal, and runway complex.

See also
List of airports in Albania

References

External links 
 Airport record for Kuçovë Air Base at Landings.com.
 

Airports in Albania
Buildings and structures in Kuçovë